Kristien Shaw, also known as Kristien Shaw-Kemmer, Kristien Kemmer or Kristien Shaw-Ziska (born July 25, 1952) is an American former professional tennis player.

She had a career-high singles ranking of No. 10 in 1977.

Career finals

Doubles (1 loss)

World Team Tennis
In 1974, Shaw was a member of the World Team Tennis champion Denver Racquets.

References

External links
 
 

American female tennis players
1952 births
Living people
Tennis people from California
21st-century American women